Eva Beatriz González Tate (born 22 April 1997) is a professional footballer who plays as a midfielder for Liga MX Femenil side Club América. Born in the United States, she represents the Mexico women's national team. Previous to her professional career, she was part of the Seton Hall University's Division 1 Women's Soccer program in South Orange, New Jersey.

Club career

Club América 
González signed her first professional contract with Club América of the Liga MX Femenil in July 2020.

International career
González made her senior debut for Mexico on 5 September 2022 in a friendly match against New Zealand.

References

External links
 

1997 births
Living people
Citizens of Mexico through descent
Mexican women's footballers
Women's association football midfielders
Mexico women's international footballers
American women's soccer players
Seton Hall Pirates women's soccer players
American sportspeople of Mexican descent
Sportspeople from Dallas